Communauté d'agglomération Lisieux Normandie is the communauté d'agglomération, an intercommunal structure, centred on the town of Lisieux. It is located in the Calvados department, in the Normandy region, northwestern France. It was created in January 2017 by the merger of the former communautés de communes Lintercom Lisieux - Pays d'Auge - Normandie, Vallée d'Auge, Trois Rivières, Pays de Livarot and Pays de l'Orbiquet. It was expanded with six communes from the former communautés de communes de Cambremer in January 2018. Its area is 951.6 km2. Its population was 73,252 in 2019, of which 20,038 in Lisieux proper. Its seat is in Lisieux.

Communes
The communauté d'agglomération consists of the following 53 communes:

Belle Vie en Auge
Beuvillers
La Boissière
Cambremer
Castillon-en-Auge
Cernay
Coquainvilliers
Cordebugle
Courtonne-la-Meurdrac
Courtonne-les-Deux-Églises
Fauguernon
Firfol
La Folletière-Abenon
Fumichon
Glos
Hermival-les-Vaux
L'Hôtellerie
La Houblonnière
Lessard-et-le-Chêne
Lisieux
Lisores
Livarot-Pays-d'Auge
Marolles
Méry-Bissières-en-Auge
Le Mesnil-Eudes
Le Mesnil-Guillaume
Le Mesnil-Simon
Mézidon Vallée d'Auge
Les Monceaux
Montreuil-en-Auge
Moyaux
Notre-Dame-de-Livaye
Notre-Dame-d'Estrées-Corbon
Orbec
Ouilly-du-Houley
Ouilly-le-Vicomte
Le Pin
Le Pré-d'Auge
Prêtreville
Rocques
Saint-Denis-de-Mailloc
Saint-Désir
Saint-Germain-de-Livet
Saint-Jean-de-Livet
Saint-Martin-de-Bienfaite-la-Cressonnière
Saint-Martin-de-la-Lieue
Saint-Martin-de-Mailloc
Saint-Ouen-le-Pin
Saint-Pierre-des-Ifs
Saint-Pierre-en-Auge
Val-de-Vie
Valorbiquet
La Vespière-Friardel

References

Lisieux Normandie
Lisieux Normandie